PS-47 Mirpur Khas-I is a constituency of the Provincial Assembly of Sindh.

General elections 2003

General elections 2008

General elections 2013

See also
 PS-46 Sanghar-VI
 PS-48 Mirpur Khas-II

References

External links
 Election commission Pakistan's official website
 Awazoday.com check result
 Official Website of Government of Sindh

Constituencies of Sindh